Henri Gouhier (5 December 1898 – 31 March 1994) was a French philosopher, a historian of philosophy, and a literary critic.

Biography
Born in Auxerre, Yonne, Gouhier's studies led to a doctorate in 1926. He served as the Professor of philosophy at a lycée in Troyes from 1925 to 1928. Then he taught at the Faculty of Arts at the University of Lille between 1929 and 1940; subsequently, he taught at the University of Bordeaux during 1940 and 1941.

Gouhier was a professor at the Sorbonne for twenty-seven years from 1941 to 1968. In 1979 he was elected to the Académie française and in 1988 was awarded the Prix mondial Cino Del Duca.

Gouhier supervised the undergraduate dissertation of famed sociologist Pierre Bourdieu, a translation of and commentary on Leibniz's Animadversions. He also was a teacher of Michel
Foucault and was the chair of his thesis jury.

He died in Paris.

Honours
 Commander of the Legion of Honor
 Grand Officer of the Ordre National du Mérite
 Commander of the Ordre des Arts et des Lettres

References

1898 births
1994 deaths
People from Auxerre
Academic staff of the University of Paris
Academic staff of the University of Bordeaux
French literary critics
Academic staff of the University of Lille Nord de France
Members of the Académie Française
French historians of philosophy
Commandeurs of the Légion d'honneur
French male non-fiction writers
20th-century French philosophers
20th-century French male writers